Youngiibacter is a genus of bacteria from the family of Clostridiaceae.

References

Clostridiaceae
Bacteria genera
Taxa described in 2014